Head Coaches of the Hamilton Tigers and the Quebec Bulldogs

as the Quebec Bulldogs:

 Charles Nolan 1910–12
 Joe Malone 1912–17
 Mike Quinn 1919–20 (as Quebec Athletics)

as the Hamilton Tigers:

 Percy Thompson 1920–22
 Art Ross 1922–23
 Ken Randall 1923–24
 Percy LeSueur 1924
 Jimmy Gardner 1924–25

See also
List of NHL head coaches

References
 

 
Hamilton Tigers head coaches